Perrywood is a village and a wood near the village of Selling, in the Swale District, in the English county of Kent. It is south of the town of Faversham.

References 
Philip's Navigator Britain (page 93)

Borough of Swale
Villages in Kent